Kafiluddin Chowdhury was a Bangladesh Awami League politician and former member of Provincial and National Assembly of Pakistan.

Early life
Chowdhury was born in 1898 in Dayhata Majidpur, Srinagar, Munshiganj. He graduated from Hasara Kalikishore High School. He finished his law degree in Kolkata.

Career
Chowdhury started his legal career in Munshiganj sub-divisional court. He moved his practice to Dhaka. He started his political career in the Krishak Praja Party of AK Fazlul Huq. He campaigned for the Movement for Pakistan In 1954 he was elected to the provincial assembly. He served as the Minister of Law, Forest, Roads and Communication, and Land ministries in the provincial government of East Pakistan.

He was imprisoned after president Ayub Khan declared Martial Law. He was elected to the National assembly in 1970. He crossed over to India during Bangladesh Liberation War.

Death and legacy
In November 1971 he had a heart attack. He moved to independent Bangladesh after the war on 31 January 1972. He died on 12 May 1972. His son Badruddoza Chowdhury would become the 13th President of Bangladesh for a short stint of only six(6) and a half months.

References

Krishak Sramik Party politicians
Awami League politicians
1898 births
1972 deaths